is a Japanese triple jumper. He is the 2011 national champion in the event and finished fourth at the 2011 Asian Championships.

Personal best

International competition

National title
Japanese Championships
Triple jump: 2011

References

External links

Shinya Sogame at JAAF 

1987 births
Living people
Sportspeople from Ehime Prefecture
Japanese male triple jumpers
Japan Championships in Athletics winners